Dr. Algernon Sidney Speer was a Florida settler and politician, serving as House of Representative for Orange County, Florida in the Florida State Legislature from 1854-1855. Before his political career, he was also a lawyer, horticulturist, farmer. Speer's Landing is named for him.

References

Citrus farmers from Florida
Members of the Florida House of Representatives
People from Orange County, Florida
County commissioners in Florida